The Veado River is a river of Espírito Santo state in eastern Brazil. It is a tributary of the Santo Antônio River which in turn joins the Itaúnas River.

The river flows through the  Córrego do Veado Biological Reserve from west to east in the municipality of Pinheiros, Espírito Santo.

See also
List of rivers of Espírito Santo

References

Rivers of Espírito Santo